Reorganization plan may refer to:

 In the United States, a plan enacted under presidential reorganization authority
 Reorganization Plans No. 1, 2, and 3 under the Reorganization Act of 1939
 Reorganization Plan No. 3 of 1970
 Land-use planning